South Western Trains may refer to:

South West Trains (1996–2017), registered as Stagecoach South Western Trains Limited, former train operator in England
South Western Railway (train operating company), registered as First MTR South Western Trains Limited,  current train operator in England